Archimedes Leonidas Attilio Patti (July 21, 1913 – April 23, 1998) was a lieutenant colonel in the United States Army and an Office of Strategic Services officer who headed operations in Kunming and Hanoi in 1945. Patti is known for having worked closely with the Việt Minh and Hồ Chí Minh, the leader of the Vietnamese independence movement and the future president of North Vietnam.

Early life 
Patti was born in The Bronx, New York City, on July 21, 1913 to Sicilian immigrants. His father worked as a tailor, his mother as a dress maker.

He was married to Margaret Telford. They had two daughters.

Career 
The 1940 U.S. census lists Archimedes' profession as "Special Agent, U.S. War Department." In 1941, he joined the U.S. Army and served in Europe, where he was in contact with various anti-Axis resistance organizations including groups in North Africa, Italy, and Yugoslavia.

He was later transferred to the Office of Strategic Services in China after he had unknowingly volunteered for the mission in January 1944 on an assignment at Anzio with OSS Director William J. Donovan.

Indochina and Vietnam 
During his career in China and Southeast Asia, Patti met Hồ Chí Minh, the leader of the Việt Minh who was later the leader and national hero of North Vietnam. In later interviews, Patti explained that his mission in Vietnam was to establish an intelligence network but not to assist the French in any way in their attempt to re-gain control over their former colony, a policy choice that he believed to be linked to U.S. President Franklin D. Roosevelt's belief in the self-determination of all peoples.

However, Patti, from a distance, helped to organize, train, and equip the fledgling Vietnamese forces that Ho Chi Minh was uniting and marshaling against the Japanese, which later became known as the People's Army of Vietnam. Patti worked closely with Ho Chi Minh and indeed commented on his early drafts of a Vietnamese constitution.

Patti stated that when he arrived in Kunming in March 1945, the French colonials were either unwilling or unable to assist him in establishing an American intelligence network in Indochina and so he turned to "the only source [available]," the Viet Minh.

Patti was introduced to Ho Chi Minh by Colonel Austin Glass, the OSS expert in Indochina. Patti met Ho Chi Minh on the Indochinese-Chinese border in late April 1945. Patti agreed to provide intelligence to the allies if he could have "a line of communication with the allies."

Patti later helped to co-ordinate some small attacks against the Japanese Imperial Army by using a small group of operatives known as the OSS Deer Team under the command of Major Allison K. Thomas, who worked directly with Ho Chi Minh in August 1945.

Patti arrived in Hanoi on a mercy mission with an OSS agent, Carleton B. Swift, and a French government official, Jean Sainteny. His primary mission was to assist in the repatriation of allied prisoners-of-war, as the U.S. government feared reprisals against them by the Japanese after the Atomic bombings of Hiroshima and Nagasaki. His secondary mission was to gather intelligence.

Patti met with Ho Chi Minh on August 26, 1945 over lunch at his residence in Hanoi. Several days later, Ho Chi Minh read a draft of the Vietnamese Proclamation of Independence to him. Patti offered several corrections on what he perceived to be a nearly-exact copy of the U.S. Declaration of Independence.

Indeed, Ho Chi Minh had requested an actual copy of the U.S. Declaration of Independence from Colonel Austin Glass. On September 2, Ho Chi Minh declared independence, and some hours later, Patti had dinner with him. In the fall of 1945, French colonial forces had returned to Indochina on U.S.-manned Liberty ships.

Patti left Hanoi in late September 1945 after French allegations that the Americans had been fomenting a revolution.

Later life and death 
Patti retired from the military in 1957. For 13 years, he was a crisis management specialist in the Office of Emergency Planning in Washington, DC.

In 1981, Patti stated that Julia Child, who had worked at the OSS in 1945, had allegedly submitted his position papers on Vietnam to appropriate authorities, but the way in which he had found them upon his retirement was exactly as she had sent them, and they had never been opened or read:

In retirement, he wrote a book and several articles on Vietnam. In 1980, he wrote "Why Vietnam?: Prelude to America's Albatross," which describes his relationship with the communist guerrilla leader Ho Chi Minh during the mid-1940s.

He died on April 23, 1998, at the age of 84, and is buried at Arlington National Cemetery.

Publications 
 Why Vietnam?: Prelude to America's Albatross (University of California Press, 1982)

See also 
 First Indochina War
 Vietnam during World War II

References 

People of the Office of Strategic Services
American people of the Vietnam War
United States Army personnel of World War II
United States Army colonels
American people of Italian descent
1913 births
1998 deaths